Mount Emily Lumber Company No. 1 is a three-truck shay steam locomotive that was originally owned by the Mount Emily Lumber Company. It was built in 1923 by the Lima Locomotive Works for the Hofus Steel and Equipment Company of Seattle, Washington. It was later sold to the Independence Logging Company of Independence, Washington, and then it was later sold to the Mount Emily Lumber Company of La Grande, Oregon. When it was retired in 1957, it was donated to the Oregon Museum of Science and Industry. One year later, in 1958, it was donated to the Oregon Historical Society of Portland, Oregon. The engine was operational at the City of Prineville Railroad, but it was announced in 2022 that the Oregon Rail Heritage Foundation would be the new owners of No. 1.

History 
No. 1 was initially manufactured on August 28, 1923, at the Lima Locomotive Works plant in Lima, Ohio, where nearly 3,000 other geared Shay engines were built. No. 1’s first owner was the Hofus Steel and Equipment Company, and it was delivered to their property in Seattle, Washington. The following month, No. 1 was sold to the Independence Logging Company. Before the engine was delivered to Independence, Hofus employees altered No. 1’s builders plate by chiseling off the world August and stamping in the word September, which would imply the engine was brand new. After being moved to Independence, Washington, No. 1 was used to pull log trains for the next four years. On February 20, 1928, No. 1 was sold again to the Mount Emily Lumber Company, and the engine was used to pull log trains on a shortline between La Grande and Hilgard in Eastern Oregon.  

In 1955, the Mount Emily Company was bought out by the Valsetz Lumber Company, and the rail line was discontinued in favor of log shipping by truck. The company then offered to donate Mount Emily Willamette locomotive No. 4 to the Oregon Museum of Science and Industry, since it was manufactured within the city of Portland. However, the salvage crew in charge of scrapping the former Mount Emily equipment was not informed about No. 4’s status, and they dismantled the Willamette before it could be moved. As a compensation, Valsetz had Shay No. 1 donated to the Museum, instead. The engine was stored inside a Union Pacific roundhouse in La Grande until it was demolished in 1957, and No. 1 was subsequently moved to the Northern Pacific Terminal yards in Portland. The Oregon Museum initially planned to use the Shay in a Washington Park facility near Oregon Zoo, but No. 1 was found to be too tall and wide to fit through a tunnel on the way to Washington Park, and any alternative routes were deemed impractical. 

In 1958, the Oregon Museum gave up on finding a location to store No. 1, and so they donated it to the Oregon Historical Society, which was also based in Portland. Throughout the 1960s, the OHS moved #1 around various sidings in rail yards within Portland. It was occasionally repainted for display at certain railroad conventions that took place during that decade. During one convention in 1969, members from the Cass Scenic Railroad saw the engine on display, and they considered No. 1 to be a good candidate to operate in tourist service alongside the Cass Scenic Railroad’s other restored geared engines in West Virginia. Subsequently, through the efforts of railfan Jack Holst, a long-term loan was signed by the OHS and the Cass Scenic, so the Cass Scenic could restore and operate #1 on their trackage. After being shipped to Cass, West Virginia, work began to restore No. 1 to operating condition, and during that process, it was renumbered to 3. Restoration was completed in May 1972, and No. 3 started being used as a helper for other geared engines to climb up steep grades.  

2 months later, however, an engine shed in Cass where No. 3 was stored had burned down, causing damage to No. 3. Cass Scenic crews spent the next 2 years overhauling No. 3 before it was fired up again in 1974, and the engine subsequently resumed in operating for the Cass Scenic without incident. When the long-term loan expired in 1992, the OHS, with guidance expertise and help of railroad enthusiast Martin E. Hansen, reached an agreement with the City of Prineville Railway to have the Shay operate on their trackage around Prineville, Oregon. No. 3 was then moved to Prineville in 1994, where it was renumbered back to 1, and it was placed into service on the Prineville line. It was used to pull the Crooked River Dinner Excursion and a variety of special excursion trips for school students. It would also haul hundreds of passengers during Independence Day. However, as time went on, the Prineville Railway slowly operated No. 1 less and less often, since insurance costs were rising, and growing businesses decreased the amount of available space to park a train to load passengers. After the Great Recession of 2008, the excursions on the Railway were further diminishing.   

After the COVID-19 pandemic happened, the Prineville Railway notified the OHS that, although they were pleased to have had the honor of storing the Shay, they opted not to operate No. 1 any longer, and they requested for their lease agreement to be put to an end. Since the OHS would not be able to operate a steam engine on their own, they analyzed several options about what to do with their engine. After a decision was made deaccession the Shay, on April 1, 2022, the OHS issued a request for proposals while forming a committee of Railroad personnel to analyze a new owner and a new home for No. 1. 3 proponents proposed to acquire the Shay and move it to their property. One of those proponents was the Oregon Rail Heritage Foundation, which was in search for an active steam engine to use to pull the annual Christmas trains on the Oregon Pacific Railroad throughout Oaks Park in Portland. The Foundation previously used Southern Pacific No. 4449 and Spokane, Portland and Seattle No. 700 for the trains, but their heavy weight and long rigid wheelbases cause damage to the Oregon Pacific trackage, and by 2022, both 4-8-4 engines were banned from running through Oaks Park, and because of this, the Foundation needed a smaller engine that could accommodate the Oregon Pacific line while pulling the Christmas trains.

On August 24, 2022, an OHS meeting was held that regarded who was to be the engine’s new selected owner, with all 3 of the proponents’ properties already being examined. A few days later on September 1, the OHS publicly announced that ownership of Mount Emily No. 1 would permanently be transferred to the Oregon Rail Foundation. However, the Shay needed to be repaired before it could operate in Oaks Park, so while No. 1 continued to be stored in Prineville, the Foundation temporarily loaned Polson Logging Company No. 2 from the Albany and Eastern Railroad as a standin to pull the 2022 Christmas trains. After the 2022 holiday season ended, the Foundation began to plan to have No. 1 moved from Prineville to Portland and then perform a 1,472-day boiler inspection in order to have it retubed and to be recertified by the FRA. Once operational again, No. 1 will take over the Oaks Park Christmas trains for years to come. The Foundation also plans on using No. 1 as a historic example in educating the public about how logging railroads played an important role in the logging industry of the Pacific Northwest.

Gallery

See also 

 Robert Dollar Co. No. 3
 Hetch Hetchy 6
 Virginia and Truckee 22 Inyo
 McCloud Railway 25

References

External links

Lima locomotives
Preserved steam locomotives of Oregon
Individual locomotives of the United States
Railway locomotives introduced in 1923
Standard gauge locomotives of the United States
Freight locomotives